Magalys Carvajal Rivera (born December 18, 1968) is a Cuban Volleyball Player, World champion and Olympic champion. She led Cuba to Olympic Gold Medals in the 1992 Barcelona and 1996 Atlanta Games. She also helped Cuba to win the World Gold Medal in 1994.

She has been called the greatest middle blocker to ever play the sport of women's volleyball, standing at 6' 3" tall. Known for shutting down the greatest hitters in the world. Her vertical jump (11 feet) is rivaled only by teammate Mireya Luis. Her stare is known to intimidate any player at the net, and has been called by many of her peers "the look of death". She was a dominant blocker and hitter in the world during her time as a starter for the Cuban National Team.

Magaly is still an active player in 2009 for Ciudad Las Palmas G.C. Cantur in Spain, where she is one of the best attackers and blockers being elected MVP and "best 7" several times.
In 2013/14 she plays for CV IBSA ACE Gran Canaria 2014 and is one of the Top Scorers in 
the first Spanish league. Her Team finished 3rd and Magaly was 2nd best scorer of the league after MVP Daniela da Silva with 438 points to 440 and a 44,42% success in attack (10th - 15th da Silva has 42,30%). Magaly was 4th best blocker.

References

External links

1968 births
Living people
Cuban women's volleyball players
Olympic volleyball players of Cuba
Volleyball players at the 1992 Summer Olympics
Volleyball players at the 1996 Summer Olympics
Olympic gold medalists for Cuba
Olympic medalists in volleyball
Medalists at the 1996 Summer Olympics
Medalists at the 1992 Summer Olympics
Pan American Games medalists in volleyball
Pan American Games gold medalists for Cuba
Medalists at the 1987 Pan American Games
Medalists at the 1991 Pan American Games
Medalists at the 1995 Pan American Games